Moreno Roggi (born 24 March 1954) is an Italian footballer who played as a defender. He represented the Italy national football team seven times, the first being on 28 September 1974, the occasion of a friendly match against Yugoslavia in a 1–0 away loss.

Honours

Player
Fiorentina
Coppa Italia: 1974–75

References

 

1954 births
Italian footballers
Italy international footballers
Association football defenders
Empoli F.C. players
ACF Fiorentina players
Living people